Maddalena Gaia Gorini (born January 8, 1992) is an Italian basketball player for Hatayspor and the Italian national team.

She participated at the EuroBasket Women 2017.

References

1992 births
Living people
Italian women's basketball players
Basketball players from Rome
Shooting guards
21st-century Italian women